The 2019–20 Austin Peay Governors basketball team represented Austin Peay State University in the 2019–20 NCAA Division I men's basketball season. The Governors, led by third-year head coach Matt Figger, played their home games at the Dunn Center in Clarksville, Tennessee as members of the Ohio Valley Conference. They finished the season 21–12, 14–4 in OVC play to finish in third place. They defeated Eastern Illinois in the quarterfinals of the OVC tournament to advance to the semifinals where they lost to Murray State. With 21 wins, they were a candidate for postseason play. However, all postseason tournaments were cancelled amid the COVID-19 pandemic.

Previous season
The Governors finished the 2018–19 season 22–11 overall, 13–5 in OVC play to finish in fourth place. In the OVC tournament, they defeated Morehead State in the quarterfinals before losing to Belmont in the semifinals.

Roster

Schedule and results

|-
!colspan=9 style=| Exhibition

|-
!colspan=12 style=| Non-conference regular season

|-
!colspan=9 style=| Ohio Valley regular season

|-
!colspan=12 style=| Ohio Valley Conference tournament
|-

|-

Source

References

Austin Peay Governors men's basketball seasons
Austin Peay Governors
Austin Peay Governors basketball
Austin Peay Governors basketball